David Sepkoski, Ph.D. (born January 27, 1972) is an American science historian and college professor at the University of Illinois at Urbana-Champaign.

Background and career 
Sepkoski was born in Cambridge, Massachusetts to paleontologist Jack Sepkoski.  His stepmother is the paleomammologist Christine Janis. He received his BA from Carleton College, his MA from the University of Chicago, and his doctoral degree in science history from the University of Minnesota. His publications include three books, most recently Catastrophic Thinking, which deals with mass extinction events.

Awards and honors 

 2018 - Thomas M. Siebel endowed Chair of History
 2020 - Guggenheim Fellowship

References 

1972 births
Living people
American historians
University of Minnesota alumni
University of Chicago alumni
University of Chicago faculty
Carleton College alumni